The 4th The Beatz Awards tagged "The Quadrant",  was held at Muson Center in Lagos on 21 November 2018. Nominees were revealed on October 26, 2017. The live show was televised on STV, Nigezie TV, wapTV, TVC, and BEN Television, and hosted by Kenny Blaq. Killertunes had the highest award winnings at The Beatz Awards, by securing 3 awards at the ceremony.

Performers

Presenters
 Kenny Blaq

Nominations and winners
The following is a list of nominees and the winners are listed highlighted in boldface.

References 

2018 music awards
2018 awards